Kallima, known as the oakleaf or oak leaf butterflies, is a genus of butterflies of the subfamily Nymphalinae in the family Nymphalidae. They are found in east, south and southeast Asia. Their common name is a reference to the lower surface of their wings, which is various shades of brown like a dead leaf.

When the wings are held closed, this results in a remarkable masquerade of a dead leaf, further emphasized by their wing shape.

Taxonomy
This genus has traditionally also included a number of African species, but they are now usually placed in Kallimoides, Junonia (alternatively in Kamilla) and Mallika. The following species are currently members of the genus Kallima:

Kallima albofasciata Moore, 1877 – Andaman oakleaf
Kallima alompra Moore, 1879 – scarce blue oak leaf
Kallima buxtoni Moore, 1879
Kallima horsfieldii (Kollar, 1844) – Sahyadri blue oakleaf
Kallima inachus (Boisduval, 1846) – orange oakleaf, Indian oakleaf, dead leaf
Kallima limborgii Moore, 1879 – Peninsular Malaya leaf butterfly
Kallima knyvetti de Nicéville, 1886 – scarce blue oakleaf
Kallima paralekta (Horsfield, 1829) – Indian leafwing 
Kallima philarchus (Westwood, 1848) – Ceylon blue oakleaf
Kallima spiridiva Grose-Smith, 1885

Gallery

References

Kallimini
Butterflies of Asia
Butterfly genera